Gonerilia is a genus of butterflies in the family Lycaenidae. It is endemic to China.

Species
Gonerilia thespis (Leech, 1890)
Gonerilia seraphim (Oberthür, 1886)
Gonerilia budda (Sugiyama, 1992)
Gonerilia okamurai (Koiwaya, 1996)
Gonerilia pesthis (Wang & Chou, 1998)

References

Theclini
Lycaenidae genera